A special election for Virginia's 7th congressional district was held on November 5, 1991 because the previous congressman D. French Slaughter Jr. had resigned due to a series of strokes. George Allen, who would later become Governor of Virginia and then a United States Senator, won with over 60% of the vote.

Results

References

1991 07
Virginia 07
Virginia 1991 07
United States House of Representatives 07
United States House of Representatives 1991 07